Epameinondas Deligiorgis (10 January 1829 – 14 May 1879) was a Greek lawyer, newspaper reporter and politician who served as the 20th Prime Minister of Greece. 

He was born in Tripoli, Arcadia, the son of Dimitrios Deligeorgis, a politician from Missolonghi who participated in the Greek War of Independence. Deligiorgis studied law at the University of Athens and entered politics in 1854. He was not a proponent of the Megali Idea (Great Idea) and thought that a better solution to the Eastern Question would be to improve the condition of the Greeks living in Ottoman-controlled Macedonia, Epirus, Thrace and Asia Minor by liberalising the Ottoman Empire. Deligiorgis was the person who, on 10 October 1862, declared the end of the reign of King Otto and the convening of a national assembly. He died in Athens, aged 50.

References

Sources
 Georg Veloudis: "Delijeorjis, Epaminondas", in Biographisches Lexikon zur Geschichte Südosteuropas. Vol. 1. Munich 1974, pp. 385–387.

1829 births
1879 deaths
19th-century prime ministers of Greece
National and Kapodistrian University of Athens alumni
Foreign ministers of Greece
Prime Ministers of Greece
Speakers of the Hellenic Parliament
Greek MPs 1862–1864

People from Tripoli, Greece